Dentelin was a region of the Frankish Empire disputed between Austrasia and Neustria.

Mentioned in the Chronicle of Fredegar, the Duchy of Dentelin included far north-eastern parts of modern France and south-western parts of Belgium. The cities of Boulogne-sur-Mer, Thérouanne, Tournai, Arras, and Cambrai lay within the duchy.

Dentelin formed part of the inheritance of the Merovingian king of Neustria Chlothar II, but was lost by him to his cousins, Theudebert II and Theuderic II, following the battle of Dormelles in 599. 

Chlothar, who outlasted his rival kinsmen and became sole Frankish king, retained Dentelin when he installed his son Dagobert I as king of Austrasia in 623. When Dagobert died in 639, Dentelin was included in Neustria, and remained part of that kingdom afterwards.

Further reading
 
  Riché, Pierre, Dictionnaire des Francs: Les Carolingiens, sv "Dentelin (Duché de)". Bartillat, 1997. 

Merovingian period
Geographical, historical and cultural regions of France